The 1969 NYU Violets baseball team represented New York University in the 1969 NCAA University Division baseball season. The Violets played their home games at Ohio Field. The team was coached by Larry Geracioti in his 10th year as head coach at NYU.

The Violots won the District II playoff to advance to the College World Series, where they were defeated by the Arizona State Sun Devils.

Roster

Schedule

|-
! style="" | Regular Season
|-

|-
! bgcolor="#DDDDFF" width="3%" | #
! bgcolor="#DDDDFF" width="7%" | Date
! bgcolor="#DDDDFF" width="14%" | Opponent
! bgcolor="#DDDDFF" width="25%" | Site/Stadium
! bgcolor="#DDDDFF" width="5%" | Score
! bgcolor="#DDDDFF" width="5%" | Overall Record
|- align="center" bgcolor="#ccffcc"
| 1 || March  || vs  || Unknown • Unknown || 13–2 || 1–0
|- align="center" bgcolor="#ccffcc"
| 2 || March  || vs  || Unknown • Unknown || 5–0 || 2–0
|- align="center" bgcolor="#ccffcc"
| 3 || March  || vs  || Unknown • Unknown || 2–0 || 3–0
|- align="center" bgcolor="#ccffcc"
| 4 || March  || vs Bates || Unknown • Unknown || 9–2 || 4–0
|- align="center" bgcolor="#ccffcc"
| 5 || March  || vs  || Unknown • Unknown || 8–7 || 5–0
|-

|-
! bgcolor="#DDDDFF" width="3%" | #
! bgcolor="#DDDDFF" width="7%" | Date
! bgcolor="#DDDDFF" width="14%" | Opponent
! bgcolor="#DDDDFF" width="25%" | Site/Stadium
! bgcolor="#DDDDFF" width="5%" | Score
! bgcolor="#DDDDFF" width="5%" | Overall Record
|- align="center" bgcolor="#ffcccc"
| 6 || April 7 || vs  || Unknown • Unknown || 4–5 || 5–1
|- align="center" bgcolor="#ffffe0"
| 7 || April 9 || at  || River Field • Philadelphia, Pennsylvania || 3–3 || 5–1–1
|- align="center" bgcolor="#ffcccc"
| 8 || April  || vs  || Unknown • Unknown || 5–9 || 5–2–1
|- align="center" bgcolor="#ffcccc"
| 9 || April 14 || at  || McCallen Field • New York, New York || 2–3 || 5–3–1
|- align="center" bgcolor="#ffcccc"
| 10 || April || vs  || Unknown • Unknown || 3–4 || 5–4–1
|- align="center" bgcolor="#ccffcc"
| 11 || April ||  || Ohio Field • New York, New York || 5–0 || 6–4–1
|- align="center" bgcolor="#ccffcc"
| 12 || April || vs  || Unknown • Unknown || 6–1 || 7–4–1
|- align="center" bgcolor="#ccffcc"
| 13 || April || vs  || Unknown • Unknown || 9–3 || 8–4–1
|- align="center" bgcolor="#ccffcc"
| 14 || April || vs  || Unknown • Unknown || 4–2 || 9–4–1
|- align="center" bgcolor="#ffcccc"
| 15 || April ||  || Unknown • Unknown || 7–8 || 9–5–1
|-

|-
! bgcolor="#DDDDFF" width="3%" | #
! bgcolor="#DDDDFF" width="7%" | Date
! bgcolor="#DDDDFF" width="14%" | Opponent
! bgcolor="#DDDDFF" width="25%" | Site/Stadium
! bgcolor="#DDDDFF" width="5%" | Score
! bgcolor="#DDDDFF" width="5%" | Overall Record
|- align="center" bgcolor="#ccffcc"
| 16 || May  || vs  || Unknown • Unknown || 26–2 || 10–5–1
|- align="center" bgcolor="#ccffcc"
| 17 || May  || vs  || Unknown • Unknown || 11–0 || 11–5–1
|- align="center" bgcolor="#ccffcc"
| 18 || May 10 || at  || Class of 1953 Complex - Gruninger Baseball Complex • Piscataway, New Jersey || 8–4 || 12–5–1
|- align="center" bgcolor="#ccffcc"
| 19 || May 15 || at  || Unknown • Annapolis, Maryland || 4–1 || 13–5–1
|- align="center" bgcolor="#ccffcc"
| 20 || May 16 || || Ohio Field • New York, New York || 6–5 || 14–5–1
|- align="center" bgcolor="#ccffcc"
| 21 || May 17 || vs  || Unknown • Unknown || 15–3 || 15–5–1
|- align="center" bgcolor="#ccffcc"
| 22 || May  || vs  || Unknown • Unknown || 5–3 || 16–5–1
|-

|-
! style="" | Postseason
|-

|-
! bgcolor="#DDDDFF" width="3%" | #
! bgcolor="#DDDDFF" width="7%" | Date
! bgcolor="#DDDDFF" width="14%" | Opponent
! bgcolor="#DDDDFF" width="25%" | Site/Stadium
! bgcolor="#DDDDFF" width="5%" | Score
! bgcolor="#DDDDFF" width="5%" | Overall Record
|- align="center" bgcolor="#ccffcc"
| 23 || June  || vs  || Unknown • Coplay, Pennsylvania || 5–3 || 17–5–1
|- align="center" bgcolor="#ccffcc"
| 24 || June  || vs  || Unknown • Coplay, Pennsylvania || 5–1 || 18–5–1
|- align="center" bgcolor="#ffcccc"
| 25 || June  || vs Colgate || Unknown • Coplay, Pennsylvania || 1–7 || 18–6–1
|- align="center" bgcolor="#ccffcc"
| 26 || June  || vs Colgate || Unknown • Coplay, Pennsylvania || 5–1 || 19–6–1
|-

|-
! bgcolor="#DDDDFF" width="3%" | #
! bgcolor="#DDDDFF" width="7%" | Date
! bgcolor="#DDDDFF" width="14%" | Opponent
! bgcolor="#DDDDFF" width="25%" | Site/Stadium
! bgcolor="#DDDDFF" width="5%" | Score
! bgcolor="#DDDDFF" width="5%" | Overall Record
|- align="center" bgcolor="#ccffcc"
| 27 || June 14 || vs Ole Miss || Johnny Rosenblatt Stadium • Omaha, Nebraska || 8–3 || 20–6–1
|- align="center" bgcolor="#ccffcc"
| 28 || June 16 || vs Massachusetts || Johnny Rosenblatt Stadium • Omaha, Nebraska || 9–2 || 21–6–1
|- align="center" bgcolor="#ffcccc"
| 29 || June 17 || vs Tulsa || Johnny Rosenblatt Stadium • Omaha, Nebraska || 0–2 || 21–7–1
|- align="center" bgcolor="#ccffcc"
| 30 || June 18 || vs Texas || Johnny Rosenblatt Stadium • Omaha, Nebraska || 3–2 || 22–7–1
|- align="center" bgcolor="#ffcccc"
| 31 || June 19 || vs Arizona State || Johnny Rosenblatt Stadium • Omaha, Nebraska || 1–4 || 22–8–1
|-

|-
|

Awards and honors 
Jim Cardasis
College World Series All-Tournament Team

References

NYU Violets baseball seasons
NYU Violets baseball
College World Series seasons
NYU